The 2022 BBC Sports Personality of the Year took place on 21 December 2022 at the dock10 studios in Salford. Co-hosted by Gary Lineker, Clare Balding, Gabby Logan, and Alex Scott, the event was broadcast live on BBC One. It paid tribute to Queen Elizabeth II and her interest in sport following her death in September of that year.

Beth Mead won the 2022 BBC Sports Personality of the Year Award, becoming the first female footballer to do so. 2019 Winner and England Cricket Test captain Ben Stokes was the runner-up, while curler Eve Muirhead finished third. The BBC do not release the actual voting statistics.

Nominees

The nominees for the award were revealed on 20 December 2022.

Other awards
In addition to the main award as "Sports Personality of the Year", several other awards were also announced:
 Young Sports Personality of the Year: Jessica Gadirova
 Lifetime Achievement Award:  Usain Bolt
 Unsung Hero Award: Mike Alden
 Helen Rollason Award: Rob Burrow
 Special Award: Kevin Sinfield
 World Sport Star Award:  Lionel Messi for Argentina's victory at the 2022 FIFA World Cup in Qatar.
 Team of the Year: England women's national football team
 Coach of the Year:  Sarina Wiegman

In Memoriam

Doddie Weir
Billy Bingham
Gordon Lee 
Terry Neill
Colin Grainger
Davie Wilson 
Maurice Norman
Des Drummond
Johnny Whiteley 
Maurice Lindsay
Phil Jackson
Kevin Beardmore 
David Stephenson
Val Robinson
Sheila Hill 
Jim Parks
Ray Illingworth
Andrew Symonds 
Rod Marsh
Ronnie Radford
John Madden
Tom Weiskopf 
Nick Bollettieri
Bernard Atha
John Landy 
Robbie Brightwell
Alan Ash
Tom Kiernan
Mike Davis
Brian Robinson
Rab Wardell 
John Paul
David Johnson
John Hughes 
Andy Goram
Tom Smith
Phil Bennett 
Ken Jones
Gian Piero Ventrone
Wim Jansen 
David Moores
Frank O'Farrell
Bobby Hope 
David Armstrong
Tony Brooks
Chrissy Rouse 
Keith Farmer
Anneli Drummond-Hay
Va'aiga Tuigamala
Eddie Butler
Betty Codona
AJ Rosen 
Tony Nash
Brenda Fisher
Brian Dickinson 
Paul Anderson
Jane Wykeham-Musgrave
Lester Piggott 
Jimmy Lindley
Harry Gration
John Hanmer 
Brent Pope
Paul McNaughton
Damian Casey 
Peter Butler
Shane Warne

References

External links
Official website

BBC Sports Personality of the Year awards
BBC Sports Personality of the Year Award
Bbc
BBC Sports Personality of the Year Award
BBC Sports Personality of the Year Award
BBC